This is a list of the longest-running scripted prime time television series in the United States, as measured by number of seasons. Only shows that have aired on a major broadcast network for seven or more seasons and at least 100 episodes are included. Those that moved to a cable network or syndication are noted below.

See also
 Lists of longest-running American shows by broadcast type:
 List of longest-running American television series
 List of longest-running American broadcast network television series
 List of longest-running American cable television series
 List of longest-running American first-run syndicated television series
 List of longest-running American primetime television series

Notes

References

Longest running prime time
Primetime